Qing Suping is a Paralympian athlete from China competing mainly in category F57-58 javelin throw events.

She competed in the 2008 Summer Paralympics in Beijing, China. There she won a gold medal in the women's F57-58 javelin throw event.

External links
 

Paralympic athletes of China
Athletes (track and field) at the 2008 Summer Paralympics
Paralympic gold medalists for China
Living people
Chinese female javelin throwers
Year of birth missing (living people)
Medalists at the 2008 Summer Paralympics
Paralympic medalists in athletics (track and field)
21st-century Chinese women